Zofia is a Slavic given name of Old Greek origin, meaning wisdom. It is a variant of Sofia. Famous people with the name Zofia:
Anna Zofia Sapieha (1799–1864)
Maria Zofia Sieniawska
Zofia Albinowska-Minkiewiczowa (1886–1971)
Zofia Branicka (1790–1879)
Zofia Czartoryska (1778–1837)
Zofia Czeska (1584–1650)
Zofia Grabczan (born 1962)
Zofia Helman (born 1937), Polish musicologist
Zofia Jaroszewska (1902–1985), Polish actress
Zofia Kielan-Jaworowska (1925–2015)
Zofia Kisielew
Zofia Kossak-Szczucka (1890–1968)
Zofia Krasińska (died 1640s)
Zofia Kulik (born 1947)
Zofia Lissa (1908–1980), Polish musicologist
Zofia Lubomirska (1718–1790)
Zofia Nałkowska (1884–1954)
Zofia Nehringowa (1910–1972), Polish long track speed skater
Zofia Nowakowska (born 1988)
Zofia Odrowąż (1537–1580)
Zofia Ostrogska (1595–1622)
Zofia Potocka (1760–1822)
Zofia Romer (1885–1972)
Zofia Tarnowska (1534–1570)
Zofia Teofillia Daniłowicz
Zofia Zakrzewska (1916–1999)
Zofia Zamoyska (1607–1661)
Zofia Zdybicka (born 1928)

See also 
 

Polish feminine given names